Jeff Smoker (born June 13, 1981) is a former American football quarterback who played for, and drafted by, the St. Louis Rams of the National Football League (NFL) from 2004 to 2005. He played college football for the Michigan State Spartans. He was also the starting quarterback for the Nashville Kats and Arizona Rattlers of the Arena Football League (AFL).

College career
Jeff Smoker attended Michigan State University.  While at Michigan State, he set many of the Spartans' passing records and when he finished his collegiate career he was the fifth leading passer-by-yards in Big Ten history.

Smoker appeared in two bowl games during his career, winning his first, and only, in the Silicon Valley Football Classic 44–35 against Fresno State as a sophomore in 2001. He lost his last bowl game against Nebraska with a score of 17–3 as a senior in the 2003 Alamo Bowl.

Smoker also played in the "Clockgate" game against the Michigan Wolverines on November 3, 2001. In the game Smoker threw the winning touchdown with one second remaining.

Substance abuse
Smoker was suspended for the last five games of the 2002 season by coach Bobby Williams due to a violation of team rules. It was later revealed that Smoker was dealing with substance abuse issues. His story and comeback was profiled in a front-page story in Sports Illustrated.  Williams was fired toward the end of the 2002 season. Incoming coach John Smith reinstated Smoker in August 2003.

Michigan State passing records
Held the following Michigan State passing records:
Records that have been surpassed are marked with an *

Career records
 Passing yards: 8,932* 
 Touchdown passes: 61*
 Pass attempts: 1,150*
 Pass completions: 685*
 200-yard passing games: 23
 Interceptions: 39
 Passing yards per game (min 20 games): 217.9

Season records
 Passing yards: 3,395 (2003)
 Pass attempts: 488 (2003)
 Pass completions: 302 (2003)
 Passing efficiency rating (min 75 attempts): 166.4 (2001)
 Total offense yards per attempt (min 100 attempts): 7.35 (2001)
 Passing yards per game (min 5 games): (2003)*
 Passing touchdowns: 21 (2001, 2003)*

Single game records
 Pass attempts: 55 vs Ohio State (2003)
 Pass completions: 35 vs Ohio State (2003)

Professional career

Pre-draft

St. Louis Rams
Smoker was drafted in the 6th round of the 2004 NFL Draft by the St. Louis Rams, he made the Rams' roster in his rookie year as the team's third-string quarterback. In his second year he was beaten out of that position by 2005 7th round draft pick Ryan Fitzpatrick and was cut from the Rams at the end of training camp.

Philadelphia Eagles
Smoker spent a brief time on the Philadelphia Eagles' practice squad in 2005.

St. Louis Rams (second stint)
He spent the 2005 season on the club's practice squad due to injuries to the Ram's starter Marc Bulger and his back-up, Jamie Martin. Due to the Rams' signing of former Miami Dolphins quarterback Gus Frerotte in the 2006 offseason, Smoker was cut from the Rams roster at the beginning of the 2006 training camp on July 26, 2006.

Kansas City Chiefs
On August 9, 2006, he was signed by the Kansas City Chiefs. Smoker was released on August 28.

Nashville Kats
Smoker was signed by the Nashville Kats of the Arena Football League (AFL) on November 17, 2006. He got his first start with the Kats on March 18, 2007 versus the Utah Blaze in Nashville. He replaced Clint Stoerner as the starting quarterback midway through the season and help lead the Kats to a 7-9 record, just barely missed the playoffs. He was released from the team at the end of the 2007 season.

Arizona Rattlers
Smoker was signed by the Arizona Rattlers, where he made his first starts after starter Lang Campbell went down with a sprained ankle. He was their starting quarterback until the league folded in 2009.

AFL Statistics

References

External links
 ArenaFan.com profile

1981 births
Living people
American football quarterbacks
Michigan State Spartans football players
St. Louis Rams players
Nashville Kats players
Arizona Rattlers players
People from Manheim, Pennsylvania
Players of American football from Pennsylvania